A shoe is a piece of outerwear worn on one's foot.

Shoe(s) or The Shoe may also refer to:

Places

 The Shoe, a hamlet in Wiltshire, England
 "The Shoe", the nickname for Ohio Stadium, at Ohio State University

People
 "Shoe", nickname of Dan Hsu, former editor-in-chief of the video game magazine Electronic Gaming Monthly
 "Shoe", nickname of Niels Shoe Meulman, visual artist and graffiti writer based in Amsterdam
 "The Shoe", Bill Shoemaker (1931–2003), American jockey

Art and entertainment

Films
 Shoes (1916 film), directed by Lois Weber
 The Shoe (film), a 1998 German-Latvian drama
 Shoes (2012 film), dedicated to the memory of Holocaust victims

Music

Groups
 Shoes (American band), a power pop band active in the 1970s, 1980s, and 1990s
 The Shoes (Dutch band), 1960s
 The Shoes (French band), 2007

Works
 Shoes (album), by Liam Kyle Sullivan
 "Shoes" (Kelly song), 2006 song and video
 "Shoes" (Reparata song), 1975 single
 "Shoes" (Shania Twain song), 2005 song, originally for Desperate Housewives
 "Shoes", a 1972 song by Brook Benton
 "Cipela", a song used as the Serbian Eurovision entry in 2009, also known as "Shoe"

Television
 "Shoe" (Robot Chicken episode)
 "Shoes", an episode of the television show Elmo's World
 "The Shoes" (Seinfeld), a television episode

Other uses in art and entertainment
 Shoe (cards), a device used to hold multiple decks of playing cards
 Shoe (comic strip)
 "Shoes", a 1907 O Henry short story

Technology
 Shoes (GUI toolkit)
 SHOE, Simple HTML Ontology Extensions, a small set of HTML extensions in the semantic net
 SHOE, Simple Harmonic Oscillator Equation, the basic equation with which repetitive motion can be described
 Brake shoe, a vehicle part
 Contact shoe, a device used on trains to pick up electricity from a third rail

See also
 Ballet shoes (disambiguation)
 Dancing Shoes (disambiguation)
 
 Shu (disambiguation) (sounds the same)
 Shue (sounds the same), a surname

Lists of people by nickname